Nicholas James Sanders (born 6 February 1971) is a New Zealand swimmer. He competed in four events at the 1992 Summer Olympics.

References

External links
 
 
 
 

1971 births
Living people
New Zealand male freestyle swimmers
Olympic swimmers of New Zealand
Swimmers at the 1992 Summer Olympics
Swimmers from Auckland
People from Takapuna